Peter Joseph Lambert (born April 18, 1997) is an American professional baseball pitcher for the Colorado Rockies of Major League Baseball (MLB).

Amateur career
Lambert attended San Dimas High School in San Dimas, California. As a senior in 2015, he was the Los Angeles Times prep baseball player of the year after going 13–0 with a 0.34 earned run average (ERA). He committed to play college baseball for the UCLA Bruins.

Professional career
The Colorado Rockies selected Lambert in the second round of the 2015 Major League Baseball draft. He signed with the Rockies and made his professional debut with the Grand Junction Rockies. He pitched in eight games for Grand Junction, going 0-4 with a 3.45 ERA. Lambert spent 2016 with the Asheville Tourists, where he posted a 5-8 record with a 3.93 ERA. In 2017, Lambert played for the Lancaster JetHawks, pitching to a 9-8 record with a 4.17 ERA in a career high 142.1 innings pitched, and, in 2018, he split time between the Hartford Yard Goats and the Albuquerque Isotopes, going a combined 10-7 with a 3.28 ERA in 26 starts between both teams. He began 2019 back with Albuquerque.

Lambert was promoted to the major leagues by Colorado on June 6, 2019. He made his debut that same day at Wrigley Field versus the Chicago Cubs, giving up one run over seven innings while striking out nine, leading the Rockies to a 3-1 win. In 19 starts for Colorado, Lambert finished with a 3-7 record in  innings.

In late July 2020, Lambert underwent Tommy John surgery and would miss the 2020 season. On March 20, 2021, Lambert was placed on the 60-day injured list as he continued to recover from Tommy John surgery. On September 24, Lambert was activated from the injured list.

Personal life
Lambert's brother is Jimmy Lambert, who is also a professional baseball player and currently pitches for the Chicago White Sox.

References

External links

1997 births
Living people
Albuquerque Isotopes players
Asheville Tourists players
Baseball players from California
Colorado Rockies players
Grand Junction Rockies players
Hartford Yard Goats players
Lancaster JetHawks players
Major League Baseball pitchers
People from San Dimas, California